The Little Deschutes River is a tributary of the Deschutes River in the central part of the U.S. state of Oregon. It drains a rural area on the east side of the Cascade Range south of Bend. The Little Deschutes and two other streams in its basin are listed as parts of the National Wild and Scenic Rivers System.

Course
It flows generally north from the mountains through the Deschutes National Forest, roughly following U.S. Highway 97 past La Pine.

It passes through the small towns of Crescent and Gilchrist and joins with the Deschutes at Sunriver.  The stream meanders significantly most of its course, though this is less pronounced above river mile 80 (river kilometer 130), which is near its crossing of Oregon Route 58.

"Wild and Scenic" designation
In 1988, the upper  of the river was designated part of the National Wild and Scenic Rivers System. The river's canyon and outwash plain contain eroding deposits of pumice and ash from the eruption of Mount Mazama about 7,000 years ago. Two other streams in the Little Deschutes drainage basin are also part of the system. A  stretch of Crescent Creek, all  of Big Marsh Creek, and the canyon section of the Little Deschutes have all been designated "recreational".

See also
 List of longest streams of Oregon
 List of National Wild and Scenic Rivers
 List of rivers of Oregon

References

Rivers of Deschutes County, Oregon
Rivers of Klamath County, Oregon
Rivers of Oregon
Wild and Scenic Rivers of the United States